is a Prefectural Natural Park on the Kunisaki Peninsula in northeast Ōita Prefecture, Japan. Established in 1951, the park spans the municipalities of Bungotakada, Kitsuki, Kunisaki, and Usa. The park encompasses the temples of Fuki-ji and Maki Ōdō as well as Kumano magaibutsu, and includes a marine zone of 41 km².

See also
 National Parks of Japan
 Setonaikai National Park

References

External links
  Maps of Kunisaki Hantō Prefectural Natural Park

Parks and gardens in Ōita Prefecture
Protected areas established in 1951
1951 establishments in Japan